Palpita rhodocosta is a moth in the family Crambidae. It was described by Inoue in 1997. It is found in Papua New Guinea and Australia, where it has been recorded from Queensland.

The wings are translucent with brown-edged spots and a rusty brown costa.

Subspecies
Palpita rhodocosta rhodocosta (Australia: Queensland)
Palpita rhodocosta erythraia Inoue, 1997 (Papua New Guinea: Normanby Island)

References

Moths described in 1997
Palpita
Moths of New Guinea
Moths of Australia